Poluru is a village in Yadhanapudi mandal of Prakasam District of Andhra Pradesh in India.

References

Villages in Kurnool district